Stephen John Pisarkiewicz (born November 10, 1953) is a former professional American football quarterback. Pisarkiewicz played in the NFL, CFL, USFL, BAFA National Leagues Britain and in the Liga Nacional de Fútbol Americano in Spain during his career. He was a first round draft pick by the St Louis Cardinals — the 19th pick overall — in the 1977 NFL Draft.

College career
After graduating from McCluer High School in Florissant, Missouri, Pisarkiewicz was recruited by Tennessee but joined the Missouri Tigers; he was considered the best passer at Missouri since Paul Christman and drew attention from NFL scouts. In 1975, Pisarkiewicz led the Big 8 in passing yards, and was second in passing touchdowns.

Professional career

NFL
Pisarkiewicz was drafted 19th overall by the St. Louis Cardinals in the 1977 NFL draft, apparently at the insistence of owner Bill Bidwill. Expected to take over the starting job from the aging Jim Hart, he failed to impress head coach Bud Wilkinson and started just four games in his time in St. Louis.

After leaving St. Louis, Pisarkiewicz played in one game in 1980 for the Green Bay Packers.

CFL
In 1982, Pisarkiewicz was picked up by the Winnipeg Blue Bombers. However, his opportunities there proved limited and he soon moved back to the US.

USFL
Pisarkiewicz spent 1983 with the Philadelphia Stars but again found playing time limited. He was given two years probation in the same year after pleading guilty to an incident of indecent exposure in Clayton, Missouri.

He spent time in 1985 with the Orlando Renegades.

Europe

Cardiff Tigers 1986-1988
In 1986, Pisarkiewicz moved to the United Kingdom and played for the Cardiff Tigers in the Welsh capital. The then-33 year old served as the starting quarterback and a coach. In 1987, the Tigers finished 7–5, while in 1988, Pisarkiewicz threw 44 passing touchdowns.

Birmingham Bulls
In 1989, following the dissolution of the Cardiff Tigers, Pisarkiewicz joined the Birmingham Bulls. Due to the absence of starting quarterback Russ Jensen. Pisarkiewicz salary was the highest in British American football. Pisarkiewicz played in one game for the Bulls, against the Dublin Celts before resigning due to internal strife.

Dublin Celts
Pisarkiewicz joined the Dublin Celts as their head coach and general manager. He coached the Celts to the playoffs, before swiftly departing for the United States where he presented the Celts with an ultimatum.

Barcelona Boxers
In 1990, after leaving the Celts, Pisarkiewicz became quarterback for the Barcelona Boxers in Spain.

References

1953 births
Living people
American football quarterbacks
Missouri Tigers football players
St. Louis Cardinals (football) players
Green Bay Packers players
People from Florissant, Missouri
American expatriate players of American football